Joseph Hodgens (5 January 1887 – 12 January 1955) was a New Zealand politician of the Labour Party.

Biography

He represented the Manawatu electorate of Palmerston from 1935, and from 1938 when it was renamed Palmerston North, to 1946 when he retired due to the failing health of his wife.

Born in Waimea South, Nelson, Hodgens was a builder, Secretary of the Carpenters Union, and served on the Palmerston North Borough Council (1919–1921; 1923–1944). He was a cousin of Pat Hickey.

Hodgens died in Palmerston North in 1955 and was buried in Terrace End Cemetery.

References

1887 births
1955 deaths
New Zealand Labour Party MPs
Deputy mayors of places in New Zealand
Local politicians in New Zealand
New Zealand trade unionists
People from the Tasman District
Unsuccessful candidates in the 1922 New Zealand general election
Unsuccessful candidates in the 1931 New Zealand general election
Unsuccessful candidates in the 1951 New Zealand general election
Burials at Terrace End Cemetery
Members of the New Zealand House of Representatives
New Zealand MPs for North Island electorates
Wellington Harbour Board members